Shah Quli is a Turkic-derived male given name meaning 'slave of the Shah'. It is built from quli.

People
Shahqoli Khan Zanganeh
Shah Quli Khan (governor)
Şahkulu
Şahkulu (painter)